Melampsora hirculi is a pathogenic fungus in the order of Pucciniales or rust fungi. It is causes disease in Saxifraga hirculus.

References

Pucciniales
Fungi described in 1902
Fungi of Iceland